The New Guinea naked-backed fruit bat (Dobsonia magna or Dobsonia moluccensis magna) is a species of megabat native to Papua New Guinea and the Indonesian islands of Waigeo, Yapen, Batanta, and Misool.

References

Dobsonia
Bats of Oceania
Bats of Indonesia
Bats of New Guinea
Mammals described in 1905